Peter Dengate-Thrush (born 1956), aka "PDT", is a New Zealand barrister specialising in Internet law. In November 2007 he was appointed Chairman of the Board of ICANN, taking over the role from Vint Cerf.

Dengate Thrush was made an InternetNZ Fellow at the InternetNZ annual meeting in August 2008 in recognition of his contributions to Internet policy issues both in New Zealand and internationally.

After his Term at ICANN ended in June 2011, Dengate Thrush switched to TLDh Top Level Domain Holdings, the parent company of Minds+Machines, where he was appointed Executive Chairman.

References

External links 

Biography at icann.org
Election of Peter Dengate Thrush as new Chairman of ICANN
Peter Dengate Thrush Election Article

20th-century New Zealand lawyers
Living people
1956 births
Date of birth missing (living people)
Place of birth missing (living people)
21st-century New Zealand lawyers